The Kirkbride Plan was a system of mental asylum design advocated by American psychiatrist Thomas Story Kirkbride (1809–1883) in the mid-19th century. The asylums built in the Kirkbride design, often referred to as Kirkbride Buildings (or simply Kirkbrides), were constructed during the mid-to-late-19th century in the United States.

The structural features of the hospitals as designated by Kirkbride were contingent on his theories regarding the healing of the mentally ill, in which environment and exposure to natural light and air circulation were crucial. The hospitals built according to the Kirkbride Plan would adopt various architectural styles, but had in common the "bat wing" style floor plan, housing numerous wings that sprawl outward from the center.

The first hospital designed under the Kirkbride Plan was the Trenton State Hospital in Trenton, New Jersey, constructed in 1848. Throughout the remainder of the nineteenth century, numerous psychiatric hospitals were designed under the Kirkbride Plan across the United States. By the twentieth century, popularity of the design had waned, largely due to the economic pressures of maintaining the immense facilities, as well as contestation of Kirkbride's theories amongst the medical community.

Numerous Kirkbride structures still exist, though many have been demolished or partially-demolished and repurposed. 

At least 30 of the original Kirkbride buildings have been registered with the National Register of Historic Places in the United States, either directly or through their location on hospital campuses or in historic districts.

History

Basis and philosophy

The establishment of state mental hospitals in the U.S. is partly due to reformer Dorothea Dix, who testified to the New Jersey legislature in 1844, vividly describing the state's treatment of lunatics; they were being housed in county jails, private homes, and the basements of public buildings. Dix's effort led to the construction of the New Jersey State Lunatic Asylum, the first complete asylum built on the Kirkbride Plan.

Thomas Story Kirkbride (1809–1883), a psychiatrist from Philadelphia, Pennsylvania, developed his requirements of asylum design based on a philosophy of Moral Treatment and environmental determinism. The typical floor plan, with long rambling wings arranged en echelon (staggered, so each connected wing received sunlight and fresh air), was meant to promote privacy and comfort for patients. The building form itself was meant to have a curative effect, "a special apparatus for the care of lunacy, [whose grounds should be] highly improved and tastefully ornamented." The idea of institutionalization was thus central to Kirkbride's plan for effectively treating the insane.

Design and architectural features

The Kirkbride Plan asylums tended to be large, imposing institutional buildings, with the defining feature being their "narrow, stepped, linear building footprint" featuring staggered wings extending outward from the center, resembling the wingspan of a bat. The standard number of wings for a Kirkbride Plan hospital was eight, with an accommodation of 250 patients. Kirkbride's philosophy behind the staggered wings was to allow individual corridors open to sunlight and air ventilation through both ends, which he believed aided in healing the mentally ill. Each wing, according to Kirkbride's original guidelines, would house a separate ward, which would contain its own "comfortably furnished" parlor, bathroom, clothes room, and infirmary, as well as a speaking tube and dumbwaiter to allow open communication and movement of materials between floors. The wings furthest from the center complex of the building were reserved for the "most excitable," or most physically dangerous and volatile patients. The center complexes of the Kirkbride Plan buildings were designed to house administration, kitchens, public and reception areas, and apartments for the superintendent's family. Architectural styles of Kirkbride Plan buildings varied depending on the appointed architect, and ranged from Richardsonian Romanesque to Neo-Gothic.

In addition to the intricate building design, Kirkbride also advocated the importance of "fertile" and spacious landscapes on which the hospitals would be built, with views that "if possible, should exhibit life in its active forms." The foliage and farmlands on the hospital grounds were sometimes maintained by patients as part of physical exercise and/or therapy. Over the course of the nineteenth and twentieth centuries, the campuses of these hospitals often evolved into sprawling, expansive grounds with numerous buildings.

Operations and staffing

In his proposal, Kirkbride outlined specific guidelines as to how a Kirkbride Plan hospital should be staffed and operate on a daily basis. Kirkbride suggested a total of 71, all of whom were required to live within, or in the immediate vicinity of, the hospital. The superintending physician, or physician-in-chief, was required to live in the main hospital or in a building contiguous to it, while his family had the option of residing at the hospital or seeking private lodging. The staff was also to have a balanced gender distribution, with approximately 36 female and 35 male staff members.

Among the staff of a Kirkbride Plan hospital were the superintending physician, an assisting physician and nurses, supervisors and teachers of each sex, a chaplain, matron, and a nightwatchman. Kirkbride urged that at least two attendants be working in each ward at any given time, and stressed the importance of the superintendent's "proper selection" of attendants, given the extent of their management responsibilities: "The duties of attendants, when faithfully performed, are often harassing, and in many wards, among excited patients, are peculiarly so. On this account pains should always be taken to give them a reasonable amount of relaxation and their position should, in every respect, be made as comfortable as possible." For general labor at the hospital, he suggested that the able-minded patients help maintain the hospital grounds and assist in duties in their respective wards.

Kirkbride's estimation of the number of staff as well as their respective compensations was outlined in an 1854 publication on the Kirkbride Plan design. He proposed a living wage for all employees of the hospital, noting that "although in a few institutions a liberal compensation is given, in many, the salaries are quite too low, and entirely inadequate to be depended on, to secure and retain the best kind of talent for the different positions. The services required about the insane, when faithfully performed, are peculiarly trying to the mental and physical powers of any individual, and ought to be liberally paid for." Salary for the superintending physician according to the 1854 guideline was to be USD$1,500 if the physician's family resided at the hospital, and $2,500 if they found lodging at a private residence. In addition to the medical staff and attendants, the Kirkbride Plan hospitals also employed laborers of various trades, including resident engineers, carpenters, cooks and dairymaids, gardeners, seamstresses, ironworkers, clothing launderers, and a carriage driver.

Decline and phasing out
By the late nineteenth century, the Kirkbride design had begun to wane in popularity, largely because the hospitals, which were state-funded, had received significant budget cuts that rendered them difficult to maintain. General psychiatric and medical opinion of Kirkbride's theories regarding the "curability" of mental illness were also questioned by the medical community.

Future

Status

A total of 73 known Kirkbride Plan hospitals were constructed throughout the United States between 1845 and 1910. As of 2016, approximately 33 of these identified Kirkbride Plan hospital buildings still exist in their original form to some degree: 24 have been preserved indicating that the building is still standing and still in use, at least, in part. 11 of the 24 preserved properties received secondary condition codes of deteriorating, vacant, partial demolition or a combination, while the remaining nine have been adaptively reused. Of the 40 hospital buildings that no longer exist (either via demolition or destruction from natural occurrences, such as earthquakes), 26 were demolished to be replaced with new facilities.

The highest concentrations of Kirkbride Plan hospitals were in the Northeast and Midwestern states. Fewer Kirkbride Plan hospitals were constructed on the West Coast: In California, the Napa State Hospital was a notable Kirkbride Plan hospital, though the original structure was severely damaged during the 1906 San Francisco earthquake, and was ultimately demolished. The two surviving Kirkbride structures on the West Coast are both located in the state of Oregon, at the Oregon State Hospital, and the Eastern Oregon State Hospital, the latter of which now houses the Eastern Oregon Correctional Institution. While the vast majority of Kirkbride hospitals were located in the United States, similar facilities were built in Canada, and the Callan Park Hospital for the Insane in Sydney, Australia (constructed in 1885) was also influenced by Kirkbride's design.

Preservation efforts

Due to their intricate architectural features and historical significance, Kirkbride Plan hospitals have attracted conservation efforts from local and national groups, and (as of 2016) approximately 30 of the buildings have been registered with National Register of Historic Places. Local conservation groups and historical societies have made attempts to save numerous Kirkbrides from demolition: The Danvers State Hospital in Danvers, Massachusetts is one example, in which a local historical society filed a lawsuit in 2005 to stall demolition of the building. The majority of the Danvers State Hospital was demolished in 2007 spite of the lawsuit, with only the center portion of the building receiving restoration and conversion into apartments. The Northampton State Hospital in Northampton, Massachusetts, was demolished in 2006.

Many of the surviving Kirkbride Plan buildings in the United States have undergone at least partial demolition and have been repurposed, often with the center portions of the buildings being most commonly preserved. The center complexes of the Hudson River State Hospital in Poughkeepsie, New York, and the Oregon State Hospital in Salem, Oregon, for example, have been retained in spite of the majority of the outermost wings being demolished. One such Kirkbride Plan facility that has survived in its entirety is the Trans-Allegheny Lunatic Asylum, though does not contemporarily function as an active hospital. As of 2017, Trans-Allegheny Lunatic Asylum has not undergone demolition.

Several facilities originally established as Kirkbride Plan hospitals are still active in the 21st century, though not all have retained the original Kirkbride buildings on their campuses. The Oregon State Hospital, the longest continuously-operated psychiatric hospital on the West Coast, retained the majority of its original Kirkbride building during a 2008 demolition, seismically retrofitting and repurposing it as a mental health museum in 2013.

Notable Kirkbride hospitals

United States

Outside the United States

In popular culture
Numerous Kirkbride Plan hospitals and buildings have been featured in the arts: the Danvers State Hospital in Danvers, Massachusetts was both the setting and primary filming location for the 2001 psychological horror film Session 9. It has also been suggested by historians as an inspiration on H. P. Lovecraft, and in turn an inspiration for the fictional setting Arkham Asylum in the various Batman series. The Oregon State Hospital was also featured as the primary filming location for the film One Flew Over the Cuckoo's Nest (1975), and was also the setting of "Ward 81," a 1976 series of photographs by photographer Mary Ellen Mark.

The Trans-Allegheny Lunatic Asylum in West Virginia was featured on the Travel Channel reality series Ghost Adventures.

Gallery

Notes

References

See Yanni, The Architecture of Madness, introduction, for more on environmental determinism.

Works cited

Further reading

External links

Historical resources
The Kirkbride Plan history at the Social Welfare History Project
The Kirkbride Plan at the Restoring Perspective project, Western University 
Kirkbride Buildings.com - historical archive with photos
Historic Asylums via Rootsweb

Photo and videography
Kirkrbride Plan Photography at Opacity 
Kirkbrides HD videography

 
Psychiatric hospitals in the United States
Psychiatric hospitals in Canada
History of mental health in the United States
History of psychiatry
Psychiatry in the United States